Elephant Butte is a populated place on the southeast end of the Elephant Butte Reservoir in Sierra County, New Mexico, United States. It should not be confused with the modern city of Elephant Butte, New Mexico that is on the west side of the reservoir to the northwest of this place.

Elephant Butte was a town formed to house people and activities supporting the construction of the Elephant Butte Dam and had its own post office during 1919 and 1920, when the mail was sent to Engle. Interments at the cemetery date from 1912 to June 20, 1989. The site of Elephant Butte is currently the location of the Elephant Butte Dam Site Resort & Marina.

References

Populated places in New Mexico
Populated places in Sierra County, New Mexico